The Independent Association of Prep Schools (IAPS, formerly Independent Association of Preparatory Schools) is a schools association, representing around 670 preparatory schools.

The majority of IAPS' schools are in the UK, with other locations including Africa, the Middle East, Singapore, and the USA.

IAPS is a part of the Independent Schools Council.

History 
IAPS was founded in 1892, as the Incorporated Association of Preparatory Schools.

In 1981 IAPS merged with the Association of Headmistresses of Preparatory Schools, and ten years later moved its headquarters from Kensington to its current offices in Leamington Spa.

In 2007 the Incorporated Association of Preparatory Schools changed its legal title to IAPS, and became known as the Independent Association of Preparatory Schools. In 2010, this was shortened to the current form.

Organisation 
IAPS elects a chairman every three years, having changed from a one-year cycle in 2015. The current Chairman is Andrew Nott who will serve until September 2024.  Vice-chairs continue to be elected annually.

Christopher King has been chief executive of IAPS since 2018. Mark Brotherton is the current Director of Education Services, Emilie Darwin is Director of Membership Services and Jackie Moore is Head of Finance.

Much of the work of IAPS is directed by various committees, made up of current headteachers of member schools.

IAPS's Board meets once a term and the association holds an annual conference every September.

Role
IAPS provides its members with a national voice on matters of independent prep school education, and seeks to have a positive influence on public opinion of prep schools,

Members are provided with advice, information and support on educational and school management issues, and receive regular internal and external mailings via the organisation.

Schools are encouraged to share their news stories with IAPS, many of which are featured in the association's partner magazine, Attain.

IAPS arranges a number of developmental courses for its members, as well as sports events for its schools. The association also hosts a jobs website advertising vacancies in its member schools.

See also
Independent Schools Council
Headmasters' and Headmistresses' Conference
Girls' Schools Association
Independent Schools Association
Association of Governing Bodies of Independent Schools
Council of British International Schools

References

External links
 Official website

Associations of schools
Education-related professional associations
1892 establishments in the United Kingdom
Organisations based in Warwickshire
Organizations established in 1892
Private school organisations in England
Prep Schools
Leamington Spa